District 9 or District IX of the Pennsylvania Interscholastic Athletic Association (PIAA) is an interscholastic athletic association in the North Central Mountain Region of Pennsylvania.  The district consists of the 6 counties of Cameron, Clarion, Elk, Jefferson, McKean and Potter.  As of the 2014–15 and 2015-16 school years, District 9 will have 35 member high schools competing in various fall, winter and spring sports.  10 of the 35 schools are located outside of the district from Butler, Clearfield, Forest, Venango and Warren counties, but compete in District 9 sports competitions.  The district is located in a very rural area of northern Pennsylvania, mostly made up of fields, forests, hills and mountains.

Sports

Fall Sports

Boys
Cross Country
Golf
Football
Soccer

Girls
Cross Country
Golf
Soccer
Tennis
Volleyball

Winter Sports

Boys
Basketball
Swimming & Diving
Wrestling

Girls
Basketball
Cheer
Swimming & Diving

Spring Sports

Boys
Baseball
Tennis
Track and Field
Volleyball

Girls
Softball
Track and Field

Member Schools

State Champions

Boys
Baseball (DuBois Central Catholic 2001 (A), Johnsonburg 2013 (A) and Punxsutawney 2007 (AAA))
Basketball (Elk County Catholic 2006 (A) and Kane 1949 (AA))
Cross Country (Oswayo Valley 1984 (AA) and Punxsutawney 1977 (AAA))
Track & Field (Clarion 2000 & 2001 (AA))
Wrestling (team championships - Clearfield 1986 (AAA) and Brookville 1999 (AA) - individual championships are numerous, however the most state individual state titles belong to Clearfield with 40 since 1938.)GirlsBasketball (Cranberry 1992, 1993 & 1994 (AA) - member of District 10, Karns City 2000 (AA) and Venango Catholic 1980 (A) - member of District 10)Cross Country (Brookville 1995 & 1996 (AA))Softball (Curwensville 2007 & 2009 (A))Track & Field (Bradford 2006 (AAA))Volleyball (Clarion 2012 (A))

Member Schools outside of District IX

10 of the 35 District IX member schools are located outside of the counties within the district.

 Clearfield (Clearfield County)
 Cranberry (Venango County)
 Curwensville (Clearfield County)
 DuBois (Clearfield County)
 DuBois Central Catholic (Clearfield County)
 Karns City (Butler County)
 Moniteau (Butler County)
 Sheffield (Warren County)
 Venango Catholic (Venango County'')

References

High school sports associations in the United States
Pennsylvania Interscholastic Athletic Association